Amblyseius brevicervix is a species of mite in the family Phytoseiidae.

References

brevicervix
Articles created by Qbugbot
Animals described in 1985